Just Another Day in Parodies is an album, released in 2000, from country music parodist Cledus T. Judd. It was his first album for Monument Records after parting ways with Razor & Tie. Although the album's title is a take-off on Phil Vassar's "Just Another Day in Paradise", Judd's parody of that song is not included on this album, but was included on his next album, Cledus Envy.

The track "More Beaver" features Brad Paisley on lead guitar.

Track listing
All parody lyrics written by Cledus T. Judd and Chris Clark, except where noted.

"My Cellmate Thinks I'm Sexy"
parody of "She Thinks My Tractor's Sexy" by Kenny Chesney (Paul Overstreet, Jim Collins)
"Goodbye Squirrel"
parody of "Goodbye Earl" by the Dixie Chicks (Dennis Linde)
"What the *$@# Did You Say"
parody of "Whatever You Say" by Martina McBride (Ed Hill, Tony Martin)
"More Beaver" (Judd, Clark, Darin Gardner)
parody of "Me Neither" by Brad Paisley (Brad Paisley, Frank Rogers, Chris DuBois)
"The Record Deal" (Judd, Clark, Lewis Anderson)
original song
"How Do You Milk a Cow"
parody of "How Do You Like Me Now?!" by Toby Keith (Toby Keith, Chuck Cannon)
"A Night I Can't Remember" (Judd, Clark, Jeff Carter)
parody of "A Night to Remember" by Joe Diffie (Max T. Barnes, T.W. Hale)
"Momma's Boy" (Judd, Clark)
original song
feat. John Anderson
"Wife Naggin'"
parody of "Sin Wagon" by the Dixie Chicks (Natalie Maines, Emily Robison, Stephony Smith)
"Plowboy"
parody of "Cowboy" by Kid Rock (Kid Rock, John Travis, Uncle Kracker, James K. Trombly)
"Merry Christmas from the Whole Fam Damily" (Judd, Clark)
original song

Personnel
Compiled from liner notes.
 Trenna Barnes — background vocals
 Mike Brignardello — bass guitar
 Gary Burnette — acoustic guitar, six-string banjo
 Chris Clark — background vocals
 Harrell Cook — bass guitar
 J. T. Corenflos — electric guitar
 Joanna Cotten — background vocals
 Stephen Davenport — acoustic guitar, six-string banjo, fiddle, mandolin
 Dan Dugmore — steel guitar
 Glen Duncan — fiddle, mandolin
 Howard Hall — electric guitar
 Wes Hightower — background vocals
 Troy Lancaster — electric guitar
 Buffy Lawson — background vocals
 Russ Pahl — steel guitar, Dobro, electric guitar, banjo
 Larry Paxton — bass guitar, tuba
 Alison Prestwood — bass guitar
 Paul Scholten — drums
 John Singer — drums
 Gary Smith — piano, organ
 Michael Spriggs — acoustic guitar, six-string banjo
 H.L. Voelker — background vocals

Additional background vocals on "Merry Christmas from the Whole Fam Damily" by Melissa Bell, Meredith Bell, Hilary Radcliff and Maddie Radcliff.

Charts

Weekly charts

Year-end charts

References 

2000 albums
Cledus T. Judd albums
Monument Records albums
2000s comedy albums